Shopping bag may mean:
Shopping bag, the physical object
Shopping Bag, the Partridge Family musical album
Shopping Bag Food Stores a.k.a. Fazio's Shopping Bag